Perdido en el espacio is the second studio album by Spanish musician David Summers, released in 1997.

Track listing

References

External links
 David Summers Biography - Yahoo!
 hombresg.8k.com - David Summers - Discography

1997 albums